The following is a partial list of Lehi operations. Lehi split from the Irgun in August 1940, and dissolved in late 1948.

Operations by year

1944 
January 28  – failed attempt to blow up St. George's Cathedral, Jerusalem, at the wedding of the  Marquess of Douro to  Diana, daughter of the British general Douglas McConnel.
February 14 – Two British constables were shot dead when they attempted to arrest Lehi fighters pasting up wall posters in Haifa.
March 13 – Lehi kills a Jewish CID officer in Ramat Gan.
March 19 – A Lehi member was shot dead while resisting arrest by the CID in Tel Aviv. Lehi retaliated with an attack in Tel Aviv that killed two police officers and wounded one.
March 23 – Lehi attack in Jerusalem kills a police officer and wounds another.
November 6 – Lord Moyne, British Deputy Resident Minister of State in Cairo was assassinated by Lehi members Eliyahu Hakim and Eliyahu Bet-Zuri; this operation triggers The Hunting Season. Moyne's driver was also killed.

1945 
October – The Jewish Resistance Movement, a cooperation between the Haganah, Irgun, and Lehi is activated by the Jewish Agency until August 1946.
November 1 – Night of the Trains
December 27 – Irgun and Lehi bombings of police stations in Jerusalem and Haifa leave 10 dead and 12 injured.

1946 
In 1946, several British high officials, including Sir Stafford Cripps, Ernest Bevin, and Anthony Eden received letter bombs apparently sent by Lehi.
February 26 – Irgun and Lehi fighters attacked three British airfields and destroyed dozens of aircraft. One Irgun fighter was killed.
April 25 – Lehi fighters attacked a Tel Aviv car park that was being used by the British Army's 6th Airborne Division, killing seven British soldiers and looting the arms racks they found. They then laid mines and retreated.
June 17 – Lehi attacked railroad workshops in Haifa. Eleven Lehi members were killed during the attack.
September 9 – Two British officers were killed by an explosion at a public building in Tel Aviv. A British police sergeant, T.G. Martin, who had identified and arrested Lehi leader and future Israeli Prime Minister Yitzhak Shamir, was assassinated near his Haifa home.

1947 
In 1947, several letter bombs were sent to President Harry Truman in the White House. They were intercepted by White House mail room workers, who were on alert because of similar looking letter bombs sent to British officials. Former Lehi leader Nathan Yellin-Mor admitted that letter bombs had been sent to British targets but denied that any had been sent to Truman.
January 12 – A Lehi member drove a truck bomb into a police station in Haifa, killing two British and two Arab constables, and wounding 140.
April 23 - Lehi mines a train outside Rehovot. The bombing kills five British officers, two Arab adults and a 3-year old, Gilbert Balladi.
April 25 – Lehi bombed a British police compound, killing five policemen.
May 4 – Acre Prison break – Irgun members working with Jewish prisoners inside Acre Prison managed to blow a hole in the wall, and assault the prison, freeing 28 Jewish prisoners. Nine Irgun and Lehi fighters, including commander Dov Cohen, were killed during the retreat. Five Irgun fighters and eight escapees were later captured.
May 15 – Two British soldiers were killed and seven injured by Lehi. A British policeman was also killed in an ambush.
June 4 – Eight Lehi Letter bombs addressed to high British government officials, including Prime Minister Clement Attlee, were discovered in London. A British soldier was killed in Haifa.
June 28 – Lehi fighters opened fire on a line of British soldiers waiting in line outside a Tel Aviv theater, killing three soldiers and wounding two. One Briton was also killed and several wounded in a Haifa hotel. A Jewish fighter was also wounded.
June 29 – Four British soldiers were wounded in a Lehi attack at a Herzliya beach.
September 3 – A postal bomb sent by either Irgun or Lehi exploded in the post office sorting room of the British War Office in London, injuring two.
September 26 – Irgun fighters robbed a bank, killing four British policemen.
November 13 – Lehi grenade attack on British soldiers in cafe leaves 1 dead and 27 wounded.
December 25 – Lehi members machine-gun two British soldiers in a Tel Aviv cafe.

1948 
January 4 – Lehi detonates a truck bomb against the headquarters of the paramilitary al-Najjada located in Jaffa's Town Hall, killing 15 Arabs and injuring 80.
February 29, March 31 – Cairo–Haifa train bombings 1948
April 9–11 – About 110 Arabs massacred (the estimate generally accepted by scholars, instead of the first announced number of 254) during and after the battle at the village of Deir Yassin near Jerusalem, by 132 Irgun and 60 Lehi fighters.
May 3 – A Lehi book bomb posted to the parental home of British Major Roy Farran was opened by his brother Rex, killing him. Roy Farran was court-martialed on a charge of murdering an unarmed 16-year-old member of Lehi during his command of an undercover Palestine Police unit.
September 17 – Assassination of Folke Bernadotte
October 28 – Al-Dawayima massacre (killing of Arab civilians by IDF Battalion composed of former Irgun and Lehi members).

See also 
 List of Lehi members
 List of Irgun operations
 Jewish insurgency in Palestine
 Irgun and Lehi internment in Africa

References

External links 
 lehi.org.il 1947-1948

Bibliography

 

Operations
1948 Arab–Israeli War
Zionist terrorism
Terrorism in Mandatory Palestine
Terrorist incidents in Asia in the 1940s
Mandatory Palestine-related lists